Jeff Phillips may refer to:

 Jeff Phillips (singer), Australian TV personality, musical theatre actor and pop singer
 Jeff Daniel Phillips, actor from the GEICO "caveman" commercials
 Jeff Phillips (trainer), American fitness trainer and actor
 Jeff "Big Juicy Papa" Phillips, saxophone player from the band Johnny and the Moon
 Jeff Phillips (skateboarder), American professional skateboarder
 Jeff Phillips (sprinter), American sprinter and champion at the 1982 USA Outdoor Track and Field Championships
 Jeff Phillips, financial advisor and candidate for the U.S. House of Representatives in North Carolina in 2010